Bangarraju is a 2022 Indian Telugu-language supernatural drama film directed by Kalyan Krishna Kurasala. Produced by Annapurna Studios and Zee Studios, Bangarraju is a sequel to the 2016 film Soggade Chinni Nayana and stars Nagarjuna, Ramya Krishna, Naga Chaitanya and Krithi Shetty.

Bangarraju was filmed from August to December 2021, with film score and soundtrack composed by Anup Rubens. Bangarraju was released theatrically on 14 January 2022, coinciding with Sankranti. It received mixed reviews from critics and was a box office success, grossing over  crore worldwide.

Plot
When Bangarraju is returning to Narakam, he is told that he has been shifted to Svargam due to the good deeds that he has done during his time back on earth. After a few months, Ramu and Seetha both have a child, but Seetha dies after bearing the child. Sathyabhama and Ramu decide to take care of the child and name him Bangarraju, and simultaneously Ramu's cousin Ramesh also names their child Naga Lakshmi, and they decide that they will get them both married in the future. However, due to Ramu's heavy work schedule, he decides to leave his child with Satyabhama. As Chinna Bangarraju is growing up, he shares a lot of the same qualities that his grandfather had while also having conflicts with Naga Lakshmi. In one such instance where Chinna Bangarraju is found with a girl, Satyabhama sees this and has a heart attack, which she dies from. She then finds Bangarraju's soul in Svargam flirting with the other ladies, and Bangarraju is shocked to see her die this early.

They then see Chinna Bangarraju all grown up and that he has become the same man that his grandfather was, and at the same time Naga Lakshmi is trying to become the village Sarpanch after her father. With Chinna Bangarraju and Naga Lakshmi constantly fighting, both Bangarraju and Satyabhama ask permission from Yama and Indra to go back to earth to solve their problems and get married. Meanwhile, Ramesh encounters a problem with the lands of a friend. and Chinna Bangarraju helps him and fights off ruthless henchmen. The henchmen come back and try to kill Chinna Bangarraju at a pooja in the temple, and due to this, Naga Lakshmi reacts violently and slaps Bangarraju. It is then found out that Chinna Bangarraju's cousin Aadi has been planning to get Chinna Bangarraju killed because they know that Chinna Bangarraju's family has been protecting a temple that has rare stones at the bottom of it and to get the stones, they need to kill the family.

Meanwhile, Bangarraju tries to get Naga Lakshmi to like Chinna Bangarraju, which she does. In a turn of events, it is revealed that Aadi's father Sampath was still alive and that he has been also seeking vengeance against the family for killing his father and grandfather. At the same time, Bangarraju successfully gets Chinna Bangarraju and Naga Lakshmi to love each other. Sampath, on the other hand, knows that Bangarraju's soul is the one that killed his father and grandfather and that the soul is back now also for Chinna Bangarraju and tells Aadi about it. With this, Sampath plans to get a ring that will be placed on Chinna Bangarraju's hand during his engagement which will stop Bangarraju's soul from entering his body. It is then found out that Ramesh was also in on this plan all along, and that he also wants Chinna Bangarraju to be killed for the stones and the potential marriage to his daughter to Aadi. 

Knowing all of this, Bangarraju and Satyabhama try various ways to stop Chinna Bangarraju from being killed, but he ultimately ends up being kidnapped by Aadi and is brought to Sampath and Ramesh to be killed. When Chinna Bangarraju is on the verge of being killed, the divine snake from the earlier film falls on Ramu's car, and Bangarraju, sensing this, jumps into Ramu's body to fight Sampath, Ramesh, and Aadi. Chinna Bangarraju regains consciousness, and the ring is removed from his hand, allowing Bangarraju to also enter his body. After both Chinna Bangarraju and Ramu kill Sampath and Aadi, they plan to kill Ramesh also but stop due to them seeing Naga Lakshmi, and they decide not to tell her the truth. Chinna Bangarraju and Naga Lakshmi both get married, and at a pooja alter, Yama and Indra impose a barrier that allows Chinna Bangarraju and Ramu to see and touch Bangarraju and Satyabhama. Chinna Bangarraju sees Satyabhama and talks about how he lived with sadness after her death and he begs her not to leave him again. 

Meanwhile, Ramu says that him seeing Bangarraju for the first time gives him a sense of braveness to which Bangarraju replies saying that Ramu needs to be a better father to Chinna Bangarraju and that he should not neglect his son due to Ramu constantly focusing on his work. After an emotional union both Bangarraju and Satyabhama's souls are then joined with Shiva since their karma was completed.

Cast 

 Akkineni Nagarjuna in a dual role as Bangarraju and Ram "Ramu" Mohan
 Ramya Krishna as Satyabhama
 Naga Chaitanya as Chinna Bangarraju 
 Krithi Shetty as Naga Lakshmi
 Sampath Raj as Sampath
 Rao Ramesh as Ramesh
 Govind Padmasoorya as Aadi (S/O Sampath) 
 Brahmaji as Chinna Bangarraju's uncle
 Vennela Kishore as Chinna Bangarraju's uncle
 Jhansi as Chinna Bangarraju's aunt
 Anitha Chowdhary as Chinna Bangarraju's aunt
K. Naga Babu as Yama Dharma Raja
 Ravi Prakash as Indra
 Duvvasi Mohan as Chitragupta
 Gundu Sudarshan as Narada
 Chalapathi Rao as Chalapathi
 Annapurna as Nagalakshmi's grandmother 
 Rajshri Nair as Nagalakshmi's mother 
 Rohini Reddy as Nagalakshmi's friend
 Surekha Vani as Sampath's wife
 Praveen as Rambabu
 Ranjith Velayudhan  as Harish
 Naga Mahesh as Siddhanti
 Phanindra Gollapalli as School Teacher
Cameo appearances
Meenakshi Dixit as Apsara
Darshana Banik as Apsara
Vedhika as Apsara
Simrat Kaur in a cameo role
Daksha Nagarkar in "Entha Sakkagundiro" song 
Faria Abdullah in "Vaasivaadi Tassadiyya" song

Production 
Following the success of Soggade Chinni Nayana in 2016 and the accompanying popularity of Bangarraju's character, Nagarjuna announced the film's sequel with Kurasala returning as the director. The sequel is titled Bangarraju after the original's protagonist with Nagarjuna reprising his role. Ramya Krishna also reprised her role as Satyabhama. Nagarjuna's son Naga Chaitanya is cast as Bangarraju's grandson Chinna Bangarraju. Krithi Shetty was paired opposite him as Naga Lakshmi. According to Kurasala, Bangarraju has a fresh storyline and stands on its own, despite it being a sequel. Kurasala planned to cast Nagarjuna's second son Akhil Akkineni in the film, but did not materialize due to scheduling conflicts.

Bangarraju production was supposed to begin some time after Soggade Chinni Nayana but was postponed due to several reasons. Kurasala completed its pre-production works in November 2020 and began casting for the film. In March 2021, during a press meet of Wild Dog, Nagarjuna announced his intentions to release Bangarraju in January 2022, aiming for a Sankranti release.

The film was launched with a formal puja ceremony in Hyderabad on 20 August 2021. Anup Rubens, who composed the music for Soggade Chinni Nayana, returns for Bangarraju. Annapurna Studios and Zee Studios have collaborated to jointly produce the project with Nagarjuna as its producer. Principal photography of the film began on 25 August. Shooting took place at the Ramoji Film City. The production then shifted to Mysore where a week-long schedule took place. Filming wrapped up on 23 December 2021. It was scheduled to release on 14 January 2022 coinciding with Sankranti.

Music

The film score and soundtrack album of the film is composed by Anup Rubens. The music rights were acquired by Zee Music.

Reception

Critical reception 
Bangarraju received mixed reviews from critics. Writing for Cinema Express, Murali Krishna CH called it a "perfect follow-up for its predecessor, Soggade Chinni Nayana." "The film is peppered with hilarious one-liners, and Kalyan Krishna perfectly captures the portrait and vibe of a coastal village, complete with characters that are rooted in the setting," he added. Anji Shetty of Sakshi stated that Nagarjuna and Chaitanya's performance is the core strength of the film with a particular praise for the climax sequence.

The Times of India critic Neeshita Nyapati opined that Bangarraju was an "old wine in a new bottle," and had nothing fresh to offer. On the technical aspects, she wrote: "Anup Rubens' music is fun and fits well into the story. Cinematographer Yuvaraj also pulls off the visuals well. The weak VFX however is a let-down and doesn't let you immerse well into the story." Calling Bangarraju a "passable festive entertainer," Sangeetha Devi Dundoo of The Hindu felt that the sequel banked heavily on Nagarjuna and Chaitanya but barely skimmed the surface of the supernatural revenge family drama story. The Indian Express''' critic Manoj Kumar R criticized the film and pointed out over-sexualisation, unoriginality, lack of common sense and basic respect for logical thinking and honest storytelling as its problems.

Box officeBangarraju was successful at the box office, grossing around 118.87 crore in three weeks of its run. On its opening day, Bangarraju grossed  crore worldwide, with a distributor's share of  crore. By the second day of the release, the film collected a total gross of  crore worldwide, with a distributor's share of  crore.

 Future 
During a promotional event of the film in January 2022, Nagarjuna, answering a question posed by a journalist, asserted a possibility of a sequel to Bangarraju''  of Soggade Chinni Nayana 2016 movie.

Notes

References

External links 
 
 

Indian supernatural films
Indian drama films
2020s supernatural films
2022 action drama films
Films shot in Hyderabad, India
Films shot at Ramoji Film City
Films shot in Mysore
Indian sequel films
Films directed by Kalyan Krishna